Dusty the Dusthole was a Clark County Department of Air Quality & Environmental Management mascot created 2003 in Las Vegas, Nevada. The character and his trademark slogan "Don't Be a Dusthole" were seen by millions of residents and tourists in the state of Nevada via a massive media push consisting of billboards, radio ads, public appearances, TV spots, and print coverage.

Background
In 2003, and in response to the threat of federal funding loss due to unacceptable levels of dust pollution in the Las Vegas Valley (which then were in violation of US Environmental Protection Agency policy), the "Dusty" character and its associated campaigns were created by Nevada-based agency Thomas Puckett in conjunction with the Clark County, Nevada Department of Air Quality & Environmental Management.

Within three years the campaign succeeded in raising awareness of dust and its serious contribution to the Las Vegas Valley air pollution issue. $1.2-million in dust violation and other pollutant-related fines were channeled to the local school district during the period.

Within a decade, the EPA declared the Las Vegas Valley "clean," meeting US federal standards for airborne dust particles. The "Don't Be a Dusthole" campaign---by then retired---was cited as a positive contributing factor.

Controversy
The "Dusty" character was so pervasive in the state of Nevada that off-roading groups defended themselves against the new awareness and scrutiny, having lost some of their longstanding travel privileges as result of Dusty's ubiquitous presence.

Conversely, the Las Vegas area media declared the Dusthole character "(not) such a bad guy after all", having saved the State of Nevada from a $280-million loss of funds thanks to the precipitous drop in dust and other pollutants from the time of the campaign's inception.

Dusthole
The "Dusty the Dusthole" character was portrayed by lifelong Las Vegas resident Alan Burd. In the Dusthole ad campaign's opening years, Burd was a common sight at various fairs and functions as the Dusty character.

In December 2014, a bi-weekly Capitol Hill-based publication from National Association of Counties featured the Dusty character in a word search puzzle.

References

External links
 

Public awareness campaigns
Male characters in advertising
Public service announcement characters
Clark County, Nevada
Culture of Clark County, Nevada
Mascots introduced in 2003